Lauri Kärmeniemi (born April 17, 1991) is a Finnish professional ice hockey defenceman who currently plays for Ferencvárosi TC of the Erste Liga He previously played for HPK of the SM-liiga.

References

External links

1991 births
Living people
Ferencvárosi TC (ice hockey) players
HC Shakhtyor Soligorsk players
HPK players
Finnish ice hockey defencemen
Gentofte Stars players
Gothiques d'Amiens players
KooKoo players
Lempäälän Kisa players
SaPKo players
TuTo players
People from Hämeenlinna
Sportspeople from Kanta-Häme
21st-century Finnish people